Giacomo Bargone was an Italian painter of the Baroque period, born and active in Genoa. He trained with Andrea and Ottavio Semini. He excited the jealousy of a contemporary artist, Lazzaro Calvi, who reputedly poisoned him and ransomed his cat for several thousand ducats. He flourished in the 16th century.

References

References

16th-century Italian painters
Italian male painters
Painters from Genoa
Italian Baroque painters